V528 Carinae (V528 Car, HD 95950, HIP 54021) is a variable star in the constellation Carina.

V528 Carinae has an apparent visual magnitude that varies between about 6.3 and 6.8. It is a distant star but the exact distance is uncertain.

It has a radius of 415 solar radii.

It is classified as a slow irregular variable whose prototype is TZ Cassiopeiae.

References

Carina (constellation)
Slow irregular variables
Carinae, V528
M-type supergiants
CD−60 3327
095950
054021
J11030616-6054387
IRAS catalogue objects